Jamalpur Assembly constituency may refer to 

 Jamalpur, Bihar Assembly constituency
 Jamalpur, West Bengal Assembly constituency